John Barney Weaver (March 28, 1920 – April 10, 2012) was a sculptor from Anaconda, Montana. He was known for creating a statue of Charles Marion Russell at the National Statuary Hall Collection, and three busts of Chester W. Nimitz for the United States Navy.

Biography 
John Barney Weaver was born on March 28, 1920 in Anaconda, Montana. He trained under his father, John Bruce "Pop" Weaver, a painter and sculptor. He has a son named Henry, and a daughter named Sara.

Career 
Weaver graduated from the School of the Art Institute of Chicago in 1946, where he studied with Albin Polasek and Emil Zettler. He received a teaching position in sculpture and figure drawing at the Layton School of Art in Milwaukee where he taught from 1946 to 1951. He was a curator for the Montana Historical Society for five years. He worked as a Natural History Sculptor for the Smithsonian Institution for six years. In 1966, he started working with the Alberta Provincial Museum prior to its opening on December 6, 1967. He became a Canadian citizen in 1973.  Weaver died of a heart attack at the age of 92 on April 12, 2013 at his home of many years in Silver Creek, BC. "In bronze his zest for fine art and human achievement can endure for millennia; in our hearts his strength and loving care will endure forever."

Notable works 
Weaver created over 2000 works in his lifetime.

Canada 
 The Stake, Royal Alberta Museum, Edmonton, 1967
 Pronghorn Antelopes, Royal Alberta Museum, Edmonton, 1970
 The Frieze, Royal Alberta Museum, Edmonton, 1971
 Edmonton Traders, south side of Stanley A. Milner Library, 1971
 Deerfoot, Deerfoot Mall, Calgary, 1982
 Arthur Henry Griesbach, Northlands Coliseum entrance to the LRT station, Edmonton, 1982
 The Speed Skater, Olympic Oval, Calgary, 1984
 Wayne Gretzky, Rogers Place, Edmonton, 1989.
 The Merchant, outside Sun Life Place, Edmonton, 1989
 Victoria Pacifica, Songhees Walkway, Victoria, 1990.
 Madonna of the Wheat, outside Edmonton City Hall, 2000
 Robbie Burns, Oliver Park, across from Hotel Macdonald, Edmonton, 2000
 Piper Richardson, in front of Chilliwack Museum, 2003. (Weaver's last public monument)
 Stampede Rescue, unfinished, to be completed by his son.

United States 
 World War II Jungle Fighter, Butte, Montana, 1944.
  Bust of Sam W. Mitchell, Montana Secretary of State, 1933–1955, Montana State Capitol
 Charles Marion Russell, a Montana contribution to the National Statuary Hall Collection, 1958.
 Jacqueline Kennedy, Lady Bird Johnson, Smithsonian Institution, Washington, D.C., 1962–64
 Three busts of Chester W. Nimitz purchased in 1965. Presently located at the United States Naval Academy, Annapolis, Maryland; the USS North Carolina, Wilmington, North Carolina and the U.S. Navy Museum, Washington, DC.
 The Bullwacker, for the city of Helena, Montana, 1976.
  Trophies for the Brave, Canton Museum of Art, Canton, Ohio.

Legacy 

On March 28, 2010, Weaver's 90th birthday, the House of Representatives and Senate both stopped proceedings to give the sculptor a
standing ovation as well as singing happy birthday.

Gallery

References

Bibliography 
 epl.ca

External links 

 
 aoc.gov

20th-century American sculptors
Canadian sculptors
Canadian male sculptors
Artists of the American West
1920 births
2012 deaths
People from Anaconda, Montana
School of the Art Institute of Chicago alumni
Artists from Montana
21st-century American sculptors